Indian Farmers Fertiliser Cooperative Limited, also known as IFFCO, is a multi-state cooperative society. IFFCO is wholly owned by Cooperative Societies of India. The society is engaged in the business of manufacturing and marketing of fertilizers. IFFCO is headquartered in New Delhi, India. Started in 1967 with 57 member cooperatives, it is today the biggest co-op in the world by turnover on GDP per capita (as per World Cooperative Monitor 2021), with around 35,000 member cooperatives reaching over 50 million Indian farmers.

With around 19% market share in urea and around 31% market share in complex fertilizers (P2O5 terms) IFFCO is India's largest fertilizer manufacturer.

The cooperative was ranked 66th on the Fortune India 500 list of India's biggest corporations as of 2017 with a net worth of $2.6 billion as on March, 2021.

History
1960s

The food crisis of the early '60s mobilized India's farmers and the founding fathers of a 'young' India to look for longer-term solutions. International organizations, including the American Co-operative Study Team, conducted fertiliser feasibility studies in India to increase production. The cooperative sector in India at that time was distributing 70 per cent of the chemical fertilizers consumed in the country. This sector had adequate infrastructure to distribute fertilisers but had no production facilities. With the introduction of multi-agency approach by the Government of India in the distribution of fertilizers during 1967, the private trade also entered the field of fertilizer distribution. The private sector production units provided more opportunities to the distribution network of private trade and gave secondary preference to the cooperatives in the matter of supplies. Due to this development, the cooperatives started getting less supplies of the fertilizers.

To overcome this limitation and also to bridge the growing demand for the fertilizers in the country, a new cooperative was conceived. The notion of the cooperative was especially appealing for its core values of self-help, accountability, democracy, equality, equity and solidarity. In 1964, the Cooperative League of USA proposed to the Government of India that the American Cooperatives were interested to collaborate with Indian Cooperatives in setting up fertiliser production capacity.

The idea appealed to the Government of India and eminent cooperators of the country. As a result, Indian Farmers Fertilizer Cooperative Limited (IFFCO) was conceived and registered on 3 November 1967, as a multi-unit cooperative society with the primary objective of production and distribution of fertilizers. The U.S. Cooperatives through Cooperative Fertilizer International (CFI) provided a financial aid besides technical know-how to IFFCO.1967 saw proposals submitted for Ammonia, Urea and NPK plants, notably at Kalol and Kandla in Gujarat, and on 3 November 1967, IFFCO was registered as a multi-unit cooperative.

1970s

The Kalol and Kandla plants were commissioned and built with great innovations and indigenous materials. In 1974, the plant at Kalol, Gujarat was inaugurated and project work for two more plants was initiated.

1980s

Two more Urea plants were commissioned at Phulpur and Aonla in Uttar Pradesh. IFFCO's founding managing director: Mr. Paul Pothen received the Padma Shri award for his contribution to the revival and growth of India's Agricultural and farming community. IFFCO became a stakeholder in Industries Chimiques Du Senegal (ICS), Senegal's biggest industrial venture to manufacture phosphoric acid.

1990s

The Kalol, Kandla, Phulpur and Aonla plants were expanded to increase production capacity and improve production technology to meet the increasing demand for IFFCO fertilizers and meet the growing demand for food in India. This was the decade of major transformation, which set the foundation for the growth that the organisation was about to undertake in the forthcoming years. The process led to significant expansion in the capacity and capabilities of the manufacturing units that resulted in phenomenal increase in the operational efficiency of the plants and brought them at par with the highest global standards. To further improve productivity and profitability an impetus was put on getting IFFCO on the global map and Joint Ventures were established in Oman, Jordan and Dubai. And diversified the business interests of IFFCO beyond fertilizers to sectors like General insurance, rural telephony, international trading, pesticides and even rural e-commerce. These steps proved to be a game changer and catapulted IFFCO into a new era.

2000s

IFFCO became an autonomous cooperative, expanding its presence and partnerships in India and abroad. 2000 saw the establishing of IFFCO Tokio General Insurance Company Ltd., and the launch of customized rural-centric insurance products. IFFCO acquired shareholding in the Oman India Fertilizer Company. The Paradeep plant was acquired, and the Kisan International Trading FZE (KIT), a wholly owned subsidiary for imports, exports and logistics support for fertilizers, raw materials and intermediates, was set up in Dubai. IFFCO also made forays into Jordan, established Jordan India Fertilizer Company L.L.C and promoted IFFCO Kisan Sanchar Ltd, a unique venture to bring the benefits of modern mobile communications to rural India.

2010s

IFFCO embarked on several expansion and diversification plans to increase its domestic fertilizer production capacity. These plans also included the acquisition of more plants, further overseas joint ventures and the introduction of several energy reduction measures to improve production efficiency, and minimize carbon footprint. In a joint venture with Mitsubishi Corporation, Japan, IFFCO-MC Crop Science Private Limited was incorporated to provide quality agrochemicals in India. The IFFCO BAZAR was envisioned to introduce the modern retail and information experience to rural India by combining technology with experience to deliver value to consumers in the Indian hinterland.

Plants

 Kalol, Gujarat: Commissioned in 1975 and expanded in 1997, it produces ammonia (1100 MTPD) and urea (1650 MTPD).
 Kandla, Gujarat:  Commissioned in 1975 and first expanded in 1981 and again in 1999, it produces NPK (10:26:26; Capacity 520,000 MTPD), NPK (12:32:16; Capacity 700,000 MTPD), NP (20:20:0:13), DAP (18:46:0; Capacity 1,200,000 MTPD) and water-soluble fertilisers.
 Phulpur, Uttar Pradesh: Commissioned in 1981 and expanded in 1997, it produced ammonia (9.7 lakh MT) and urea (17 lakh MT).
 Aonla, Uttar Pradesh: Commissioned in 1988 and expanded in 1996, it produced ammonia (1740 MTPD) and urea (1515 MTPD).
 Paradeep, Odisha: Taken over in 2005, it produces phosphoric acid (8,75,000 MTPA), sulphuric acid (23,10,000 MTPA), NPK (10:26:26), NPK (12:32:16), NP (20:20:0:13) and DAP (18:46:0) grade of fertilisers.

Associates and subsidiaries 

 IFFCO Tokio General Insurance Company Limited
 IFFCO eBazar Limited
 IFFCO Kisan SEZ Limited
 IFFCO Kisan Sanchar Limited
 IFFCO-MC Crop Science Private Limited
 IFFCO Kisan Finance Limited
 Oman India Fertiliser Company SAOC
 National Commodity & Derivatives Exchange Ltd.
 Kisan International Trading FZE
 Indian Potash Limited
 Jordan India Fertilizer Company LLC
 Sikkim IFFCO Organics Limited
 Industries Chemiques Du Senegal
 CN IFFCO Private Limited

See also
 Fortune India 500
 List of companies of India

References

External links
Indian Farm Forestry Development Cooperative Ltd 
Cooperative Rural Development Trust 
IFFCO Kisan Sewa Trust

1967 establishments in Delhi
Agricultural supply cooperatives
Business services companies established in 1967
Fertilizer companies of India
Companies based in New Delhi
Agricultural cooperatives in India